Chesterfield railway station serves the town of Chesterfield in Derbyshire, England. It lies on the Midland Main Line. Four tracks pass through the station which has three platforms. It is currently operated by East Midlands Railway.

The station has the PlusBus scheme where train and bus tickets can be bought together at a saving.
Chesterfield is a Penalty fare station for East Midlands Railway services.

History
The first line into Chesterfield was the North Midland Railway from Derby to Leeds in 1840. The original station was built in a Jacobean style similar to the one at Ambergate but it was replaced in 1870 by a new one further south in the current location, when the Midland Railway built the "New Road" to Sheffield. This new station of 1870 was designed by the company architect John Holloway Sanders.

In 1897, the Lancashire, Derbyshire and East Coast Railway arrived, crossing both North Midland and Great Central lines at Horns Bridge with a viaduct seven hundred feet long, leading to a station at West Bars, near the Market Place.

The line into Market Place station closed to passengers in 1951 due to problems in Bolsover Tunnel, although the station remained open for goods traffic until March 1957, when it was closed completely. The station building was demolished in 1972. The Great Central station closed in March 1963 and was demolished in 1973 to make way for the town's inner relief road.

The Midland station was demolished and rebuilt in 1963. Most of the buildings from 1963 were demolished in the late 1990s, shortly after privatisation. Most of the buildings on site now date from then.

This station is  owned by Network Rail but is operated by East Midlands Railway, which operates trains between Sheffield and London St Pancras International. The station was extensively rebuilt shortly after Midland Mainline took over its operation from British Rail in 1996. Midland Mainline lost their franchise in November 2007. The running of the station was passed to East Midlands Trains, who ran the station for nearly 12 years. Operation then passed to East Midlands Railway.

Stationmasters

J. Cooper ca. 1844 - 1855
John Rice 1855 - 1873
Herbert Thomas Brown 1873 - 1907
Samuel Morley 1907 - 1910 (formerly station master at Sheepbridge, afterwards station master of Barrow Hill, Staveley Works, Staveley Town and Whittington)
Edwin Richardson 1910 - 1917
E.H. Russell 1917 - 1925 (formerly station master at Hellifield) 
William Dean 1925 - 1932 (formerly station master at Barrow Hill)
V.L. Ward 1932 - 1937 (afterwards station master at Luton)
William Jinks 1937 - 1942 (formerly station master at Chinley, afterwards station master at Beeston)
Oliver Bates Nichols 1942 - ca. 1950 (formerly station master at Wednesbury)

Station layout

Entrance to the station is on Crow Lane and includes a car park, taxi rank and bus stop. There is also a small car park on the other side of Crow Lane, which used to be free but now has a parking charge. The main entrance leads to the station concourse, which was built in the late 1990s; it includes a ticket office, a newsagent, a café and a waiting room. The concourse and the waiting room both have direct access to platform 1. There is also a waiting room on platform 2, which is accessed via a tunnel, using the stairs or lift in the concourse.

Platforms and destinations
The fast lines have two large side platforms, one for each direction; these platforms are covered for around half their length. The goods lines pass around the rear of platform 2 and there is a third large platform here that serves the northbound goods line.

Platform 1 is for northbound trains, calling at stations to Sheffield, Manchester Piccadilly, Manchester Oxford Road, Liverpool Lime Street, Leeds, York, Doncaster, Newcastle, Edinburgh Waverley and Glasgow Central.

Platform 2 is for southbound trains, calling at stations to London St Pancras International, Derby, Nottingham, Peterborough, Norwich, Cambridge, Leicester, Birmingham, Bristol, Cardiff Central, Bournemouth, Southampton, Plymouth and Penzance.

Platform 3 is bi-directional and was opened in July 2010. As of May 2015, it is used by some services on the Leeds-Nottingham and Liverpool-Norwich routes at peak periods and  during engineering works to reduce dependence on replacement bus services. It is located on the down slow line, backing on to Platform 2, and is long enough to accommodate a 10 car train. Platform 3 had existed in a previous incarnation decades earlier, although it was a bay platform.

The building of platform 3 was originally planned for 2007/8 to go with the East Midlands North Erewash resignalling scheme; it would have allowed passenger services to run on the bi-directional down slow line (goods line) from a new Chesterfield South Junction to Tapton Junction during perturbation or engineering work on the fast lines in this area. It would have also facilitated the turn back of trains at Chesterfield during the Bradway Tunnel blockade in 2008/9. Work on the platform actually began in March 2010 and it was completed in July 2010, at a cost of £2.6 million.

Services

The 07:39 East Midlands Railway Master Cutler service runs to London via Derby and Leicester Mondays to Fridays providing a fast business train, arriving at London by 09:37.

Typical weekday service pattern:
 Northern Trains run an hourly service between Nottingham and Leeds. This service started from the December 2008 timetable change. All Northern Rail trains call at Chesterfield. 
 East Midlands Railway run an hourly service between Liverpool and Norwich and half-hourly service between Sheffield and London, with one a day extending to Leeds. All East Midlands Railway services call at Chesterfield.
 CrossCountry operate a half-hourly service from Sheffield to Derby, which continue on to a variety of final destinations; Glasgow, Edinburgh, Plymouth, Reading, Southampton Central and Bristol. Only half of these stop at Chesterfield. Due to the COVID-19 pandemic in the United Kingdom, there was an initial plan in July 2020 to temporarily cut all CrossCountry services from stopping at Chesterfield, but later revised to reinstate peak time services. The December 2021 timetable sees 20 XC trains stop on each weekday, 23 on a Saturday and 18 on a Sunday.

Based on the above, there are typically 12 passenger trains per hour passing through the station on weekdays (6 in each direction), with 10 of those calling.

In popular culture 
A pivotal scene in Frederick Forsyth's novel The Fourth Protocol took place at Chesterfield railway station, including on the station platform and ensuing action on nearby streets.

Former stations
Chesterfield was once served by three railway stations; the others were  Chesterfield Central station (closed in 1963) and Chesterfield Market Place station (closed in 1957).

High Speed 2
High Speed 2 trains are planned to serve Chesterfield. A branch off the eastern section of the HS2 line south of Chesterfield will route via the M1 running parallel to HS2, allowing trains to continue to and through Chesterfield to Sheffield Midland station. HS2 trains will continue north of Sheffield using the Sheffield to Leeds Line to branch back onto the main HS2 line north of Sheffield. On 17 July 2017, the government confirmed a stop at Chesterfield after approval of the M18/Eastern Route.

Bibliography

References

External links

East Midlands Trains

Former Midland Railway stations
Railway stations in Great Britain opened in 1840
Railway stations in Great Britain closed in 1870
Railway stations in Great Britain opened in 1870
Railway stations in Derbyshire
DfT Category C1 stations
Railway stations served by East Midlands Railway
Railway stations served by CrossCountry
Northern franchise railway stations
Buildings and structures in Chesterfield, Derbyshire
John Holloway Sanders railway stations